Pyotr Vasilyevich Fedotov (Russian: Пётр Васильевич Федотов; 18 December 1900 – 29 September 1963) was long time Soviet security and intelligence officer, head of counterintelligence in NKVD/NKGB and head of foreign intelligence as the deputy chairman of the Committee of Information.

Fedotov was born in Saint Petersburg, into a family of conductors. From 1915 to 1919, he worked for the local newspaper. After the outbreak of the Russian Civil War, he served in the Red Army.

In 1921, Fedotov joined the new Soviet security organization, the Cheka. He first served in the local Cheka/GPU/OGPU offices. In 1937, he was moved to the NKVD Moscow Headquarters, known as Lubyanka, and was put in charge of one of the Secret Political Department Sections in the Main Directorate of State Security of the NKVD. Between 1939 and 1941, he was the head of the GUGB 2nd Department (SPO). In 1940, he took part in the killing of Polish prisoners of war – the Katyn massacre. In 1941, after the creation of the People's Commissariat for State Security (NKGB), he became the head of the 2nd Directorate, responsible for counterintelligence. He personally signed a document of an interrogation on October  20, 1942 sending/placing in a gulag for 5 years a famous polish actor Eugene Bodo (Eugeniusz Junod) who died in Kotlas in 1943, due to poor conditions therein (Russian red cross document from 1992). Then in 1946, after the People's Commissariat for State Security was renamed the Ministry for State Security (Ministerstvo Gosudarstvennoi Bezopasnosti) or MGB, Fedotov became the head of its 1st Directorate, responsible for foreign intelligence. When the Committee of Information was established in 1947, he was put in charge of foreign intelligence as the deputy chairman under Vyacheslav Molotov and then under Andrey Vyshinsky. In March 1953, he was moved to the Ministry of Internal Affairs (MVD) and took over its 1st Chief Directorate (counterintelligence). He took over the same position in the newly created KGB, but as the head of the 2nd Chief Directorate (counterintelligence), of which he was in charge until 1956. In May 1956, he started working at the KGB school as deputy head of one of the departments.

Fedotov was retired from the KGB in 1959. He died in 1963 at the age of 63.

References 

Commissars 3rd Class of State Security
KGB officers
1900 births
1963 deaths